Deltoplastis commatopa is a moth in the family Lecithoceridae. It is found in Taiwan and the provinces of Jiangxi, Hunan, Hubei and Sichuan in China.

References

Deltoplastis
Moths of Asia
Moths of Taiwan
Moths described in 1932
Taxa named by Edward Meyrick